Arcade: The Comics Revue is a magazine-sized comics anthology created and edited by cartoonists Art Spiegelman and Bill Griffith to showcase underground comix. Published quarterly by the Print Mint, it ran for seven issues between 1975 and 1976. Arriving late in the underground era, Arcade "was conceived as a 'comics magazine for adults' that would showcase the 'best of the old and the best of the new comics'". Many observers credit it with paving the way for the Spiegelman-edited anthology Raw, the flagship publication of the 1980s alternative comics movement.

Well-known creators who contributed to the anthology include R. Crumb, Kim Deitch, Jay Kinney, Aline Kominsky, Jay Lynch, Spain Rodriguez, Gilbert Shelton and S. Clay Wilson.

Overview 
By the mid-1970s, the underground comix movement was encountering a slowdown, and Spiegelman and Griffith conceived of Arcade as a "safe berth". It stood out from similar publications by having an ambitious editorial plan, in which Spiegelman and Griffith attempted to show how comics connected to the broader realms of artistic and literary culture. Arcade also introduced comic strips from ages past, as well as contemporary literary pieces by writers such as William S. Burroughs and Charles Bukowski, and illustrated nonfiction pieces by writers like Paul Krassner and J. Hoberman.

Publication history 
Spiegelman and Griffith, based in the San Francisco Bay Area — the epicenter of the underground movement — originally conceived of a comics magazine for adults in  1971, planning to call it Banana Oil as an homage to Milt Gross (who originated the non-sequitur as a phrase deflating pomposity and posing). The publisher, Company & Sons, they approached about it, but was unable to make it a reality.

Some years later, in Spring 1975, with the help of Print Mint, they were able to launch the magazine as Arcade. Soon after, however, co-editor Spiegelman moved back to his original home of New York City, which put most of the editorial work for Arcade on the shoulders of Griffith and his cartoonist wife, Diane Noomin. This, combined with distribution problems, retailer indifference, and a general failure to find a devoted audience, led to the magazine's 1976 demise.

Contributors 
Contributors to every issue of Arcade included Spiegelman, Griffith, Robert Armstrong, Robert Crumb, Justin Green, Aline Kominsky, Michael McMillan, Diane Noomin, and Spain Rodriguez. Crumb illustrated five of the seven front covers. Each issue contained a reprint of work by a cartoonist from the medium's Golden Age, including H. M. Bateman, Harrison Cady, Billy DeBeck, Milt Gross, and George McManus. Each issue's title page contained individual self-portraits by the contributors.

Issue guide

Legacy 
Although short-lived, Arcade still has admirers. Famed comics writer Alan Moore said it was "the only truly worthwhile material produced during the 1970s". With the general waning of the underground scene, however, Spiegelman despaired that comics for adults might fade away for good. Frustrated with editing his peers because of the tension and jealousies involved, for a time Spiegelman swore he would never edit another magazine. Nonetheless, by 1980, Spiegelman and his wife/collaborator Françoise Mouly launched Raw, a "graphix magazine", hoping their unprecedented approach would bypass readers' prejudices against comics and force them to look at the work with new eyes.

References

External links
 Masters of American Comics by John Carlin, Paul Karasik, Brian Walker and Stanley Crouch
 Some information about the book Masters of American Comics
 

1975 comics debuts
Comics magazines published in the United States
1976 comics endings
Underground comix
Magazines established in 1975
Magazines disestablished in 1976
Quarterly magazines published in the United States
Defunct American comics